Acianthera bahorucensis is a species of orchid plant native to the Dominican Republic.

References 

bahorucensis
Flora of the Dominican Republic
Plants described in 1999
Flora without expected TNC conservation status